The Los Angeles Poverty Department (LAPD) is a Los Angeles-based performance group closely tied to the city's Skid Row neighborhood. Founded in 1985 by director and activist John Malpede, LAPD members are mostly homeless or formerly homeless people who collaborate with advocates, social service professionals and community members to create performances and multimedia art that highlight connections between their lived experiences and external forces that impact their lives.

History

Performance artist John Malpede moved to Los Angeles from New York in 1984 to start work as an outreach paralegal at the Inner City Law Center (ICLC). He began leading theater workshops for the neighborhood's homeless population out of the ICLC's offices on Skid Row, gathering a group of performers and artists who now create their art as the Los Angeles Poverty Department (the acronym, LAPD, is a deliberate appropriation of that of the Los Angeles Police Department). At the time it was founded, the LAPD was the first theater by and for homeless people in the country and the first arts-based initiative for the Los Angeles homeless population. Since its inception, the LAPD has been dedicated to giving expression to the homeless community's struggle to  create meaning out of their own lives and to avoid a sentimentalized or stereotyped narrative of victimization.  Material is often developed and rehearsed through community workshops and feedback sessions, continually evolving through conversation with the community.
The ultimate enactment of ensemble members' lives in front of an audience seeks to transform the audience into witnesses rather than spectators.

In addition to ongoing workshops and the creation of new work, the LAPD's activities include touring of their repertory and commissions. Their community partnerships include SRO Housing, the L.A. Community Action Network, The Downtown Women's Action Coalition, St. Vincent DePaul Center, The Salvation Army's Women's and Men's drug recovery programs, and the Inner City Law Center.

In 2014, the Queens Museum mounted the first museum survey of the Los Angeles Poverty Department's activity, showcasing nearly thirty years of materials.   The Queens Museum and Autonomedia also released Agents and Assets: Witnessing the war on drugs and on communities, timed to coincide with the exhibition and containing the script, notes, and conversations accumulated over 12 years of performance of one of LAPD's best known and widely toured works. LAPD is the recipient of the Foundation for Contemporary Arts Robert Rauschenberg Award (2018).

Exhibitions

Do you want the cosmetic version or do you want the real deal? Los Angeles Poverty Department, 1985-2014. Retrospective. January 31-May 11, 2014. Queens Museum.

Films

The Real Deal. Documentary. Directed by Tom Jones. Written by Tom Jones and John Malpede. 2006.

Notes

Further reading 
 

American artist groups and collectives
Performance art in Los Angeles
Theatre companies in California
Arts organizations established in 1985
1985 establishments in California